"God Be with Our Boys Tonight" is a World War I–era song written by Wilfrid Sanderson and Fred G. Bowles in 1918. It reached number three on the US top 100 songs of June 1918.

The sheet music can be found at the Pritzker Military Museum & Library.

References

Bibliography

1918 songs
Songs of World War I